Kanpur division is an administrative geographical unit of Uttar Pradesh state of India. Kanpur is the administrative headquarters of the division. Kanpur was formerly spelled Cawnpore.  The division consists of six districts:
Auraiya District
Etawah 
Farrukhabad 
Kanpur Dehat
Kanpur Nagar
Kannauj

Literacy rates 
Kanpur division is the most literate division in Uttar Pradesh with literacy rates of:
Auraiya- 78.95%
Etawah- 78.41%
Farrukhabad- 73.4%
Kanpur Dehat- 75.78%
Kanpur- 79.65%
Kannauj- 72.70%

History of administrative districts in Kanpur Division
Kanpur division was earlier part of the Allahabad division. In the year, 2000, the Mayawati government did a major reshuffle of the Allahabad division, and a separate Kanpur division was created.

The Kanpur district itself was bifurcated into Kanpur Dehat and Kanpur Nagar. Kanpur Dehat was renamed as Ramabai Nagar, after Ramabai (1896-1935), the wife of Bhimrao Ramji Ambedkar. In 2012 the name was changed back to Kanpur Dehat (though the 2011 Indian census uses the name "Kanpur Dehat").

Cities by GDP

Kanpur
Etawah
Farrukhabad
Auraiya

Demographics

References 

Divisions of Uttar Pradesh
Kanpur division